Jake Gettman (October 25, 1875 – October 4, 1956) was a Major League Baseball outfielder with the Washington Senators from 1897 to 1899. He was the first Russian-born player in Major League history.

External links

References 

1875 births
1956 deaths
Emigrants from the Russian Empire to the United States
19th-century baseball players
Major League Baseball outfielders
Major League Baseball players from Russia
Washington Senators (1891–1899) players
Fort Worth Panthers players
Kansas City Blues (baseball) players
Buffalo Bisons (minor league) players
Toronto Maple Leafs (International League) players
Newark Indians players
Baltimore Orioles (IL) players
Jersey City Skeeters players
Indianapolis Indians players
Hastings Reds players
Russian baseball players